Angela R. Nissel (born December 5, 1978) is an American author and television writer best known for her first book The Broke Diaries: The Completely True and Hilarious Misadventures of a Good Girl Gone Broke.  She was a writer and executive producer for Scrubs and is working on a television series with Halle Berry, who optioned both of Nissel's books. Nissel also worked as a writer and consulting producer in the fourth season of The Boondocks and is currently a co-executive producer and writer for the ABC sitcom Mixed-ish.

Biography 
Nissel was born and raised in Philadelphia. She attended the Philadelphia High School for Creative and Performing Arts, where she majored in Creative Writing, and she graduated from the University of Pennsylvania in 1998 with a degree in medical anthropology. She is married to WWE Hall of Famer Sean “X-Pac” Waltman.

Her first book The Broke Diaries was published in 2001 and was promoted in non-traditional ways. In one case, her friend applied "Buy The Broke Diaries!" stickers to ramen noodle packages and passed them out near bookstores.  Nissel also promoted the book in her signature when she posted on Internet forums. She has appeared on The Oprah Winfrey Show, and was featured with her mother on 20/20, which also featured her second book, Mixed: My Life in Black and White, a comedic look at growing up as the child of a biracial couple.

On October 28, 2006, Nissel made her debut as a panelist on NPR's Wait Wait... Don't Tell Me!. In 1999, she founded the music-related website Okayplayer with The Roots' drummer Ahmir Thompson.

Books

References

External links
 
 
 Memoir: Mixed, But Mixed Up No More, a March 2006 Fresh Air interview with Nissel

1978 births
American diarists
Television producers from Pennsylvania
American women television producers
American television writers
Living people
Writers from Philadelphia
American women television writers
Women diarists
American women non-fiction writers
Screenwriters from Pennsylvania
Philadelphia High School for the Creative and Performing Arts alumni
21st-century American women